Paratisiphone is a monotypic butterfly genus of the subfamily Satyrinae in the family Nymphalidae. Its one species is Paratisiphone lyrnessa.

References

Satyrini
Monotypic butterfly genera